The Guys and Dolls is a greyhound racing competition held annually at Crayford Stadium.

The competition was inaugurated at Harringay Stadium and was unusual in the fact that the heats consisted of separate races for bitches and dogs with heat winners qualifying for the mixed final. Following the closure of Harringay in 1987 the event switched to Crayford and was run until 2008 before being discontinued. In 2015 the race was brought back alongside the Gold Collar.

The event was held at sister track Romford Greyhound Stadium in 2020 because of the COVID-19 pandemic.

Past winners

Venues & Distances 
1977–1987 (Harringay, 660 metres)
1990–2019 (Crayford, 380 metres)
2020–2020 (Romford, 400 metres)
2021–present (Crayford, 380 metres)

Sponsors
1977–1982 (Ladbrokes)
2002–2005 (Countrywide Steel and Tubes)
2006–2006 (Platform Building Materials)
2007–present (Ladbrokes)

References

Greyhound racing competitions in the United Kingdom
Sport in the London Borough of Bexley
Recurring sporting events established in 1977